Malaika Mihambo (born 3 February 1994) is a German athlete and the current Olympic and world champion in long jump.

Career
Mihambo's athletic career began around 2009, when at the age of 15 she became the German under-16 champion with the heptathlon team as well as setting a best performance with the 4x100 meters relay team that lasted until 2018. In the long jump she finished ninth at the 2011 World Youth Championships, then competed at the 2012 World Junior Championships and the 2013 World Championships, without reaching the final. She also won the gold medal at the 2013 European Junior Championships, and finished fourth at the 2014 European Championships.

Her first senior major event Mihambo won at the 2014 European Team Championships, setting the new championship record with a jump of 6.90 meters. In 2015, she won the gold medal at the European U23 Championships and finished sixth at the World Championships. She narrowly missed a medal at the 2016 Summer Olympics, finishing fourth, but won the bronze medal at the 2016 European Athletics Championships. Then a serious foot injury ruined her preparations for the 2017 World Championships. After difficult months with an uncertain sporting future the injury was overcome, and she finished fifth at the World Indoor Championships.

With the gold medal at the 2018 European Athletics Championships, Mihambo's star began to rise into the world's top long jump. In 2019, she had her most successful season so far with a series of jumps over 7 meters. She won the IAAF Diamond League and became world champion for the first time. In 2021 Mihambo crowned Olympic champion at the Summer Olympics in Tokyo with a jump of 7.00 meters, beating Brittney Reese and Ese Brume, both with 6.97 meters. Mihambo experienced the preliminary highlight of her career as the first European to become world champion in the long jump at least twice in a row  – at the 2022 World Athletics Championships she defended her world title from 2019 with a SB of 7.12 meters and won the gold medal again. This also makes her the first long jumper ever to win at the world's most important track and field competitions four times in consecutive years. The streak came to an end during the 2022 European Championships - ailing in health but with a huge support of the home crowd, Mihambo managed a 7.03m leap to finish silver, while Ivana Vuleta (SRB) became the new European champion with 3cm more; Jazmin Sawyers (representing England) won the bronze medal (6.80m).

Mihambo's personal best in the long jump is 7.30 meters, achieved on October 6 at the 2019 World Championships in Doha; since then, this distance has not been surpassed by any female jumper. The foundations of their success are essentially due to a kind of symbiotic interaction with physics and sports teacher Ralf Weber, who had been accompanying her as a coach since she was ten years old. Both developed their extensive skills together by supporting each other within a manageably small family environment, as well as permanently incorporating international experience into their training. The club she represents is the LG (Track and Field Community) Kurpfalz.

Personal life
Her mother Petra Mihambo-Fichtner is German and her father is Tanzanian; she grew up and went to school in the municipality of Oftersheim. Mihambo studied political science at the University of Mannheim on a sports scholarship, graduating in 2016. Since April 2019, she has been studying in the postgraduate master's program in environmental sciences at the University of Hagen and is involved in a social project for children. On December 15, 2020, Mihambo was named “Germany's Sportswoman of the Year“ for the third time in a row; a world best of 7.03 meters on the athletic level was followed by special recognition for her social commitment to helping children and families get into athletics on the one hand and social contacts on the other.

Major competitive record

References

External links

Malaika Mihambo - Results – TheSports.org. Retrieved July 25, 2022.

1994 births
Living people
Sportspeople from Heidelberg
German female long jumpers
Olympic female long jumpers
Olympic athletes of Germany
Athletes (track and field) at the 2016 Summer Olympics
Athletes (track and field) at the 2020 Summer Olympics
Medalists at the 2020 Summer Olympics
Olympic gold medalists for Germany
Olympic gold medalists in athletics (track and field)
World Athletics Championships athletes for Germany
World Athletics Championships winners
European Athletics Championships winners
German national athletics champions
Diamond League winners
University of Mannheim alumni
German people of Tanzanian descent